The 2016 IPC Athletics European Championships was a track and field competition for athletes with a disability open to International Paralympic Committee (IPC) affiliated countries within Europe, plus Israel. It was held in Grosseto, Italy and took part between 10 and 16 June. The competition was staged at Stadio Olimpico Carlo Zecchini. Approximately 700 athletes from 35 countries attended the games. This was the last edition of the event held under the IPC Athletics title.

Russia topped the medal tables in both gold medals won (51) and total number of medals won (131).

Venue

The venue for the Championships was the Stadio Olimpico Carlo Zecchini athletics stadium which has held IPC Grand Prix athletic tournaments in the past. The stadium has an eight lane MONDO track and has a capacity of 10,200 people.

Format
The 2016 IPC Athletics European Championships was an invitational tournament taking in track and field events. No combined sports were included in the 2016 Championships. Not all events were open to all classifications, though no events were contested between classifications.

Athletes finishing in first place are awarded the gold medal, second place the silver medal and third place the bronze. If only three competitors are available to challenge for an event then no bronze medal is awarded. Some events will be classed as 'no medal' events.

Events

Classification

To ensure competition is as fair and balanced as possible, athletes are classified dependent on how their disability impacts on their chosen event/s. Thus athletes may compete in an event against competitors with a different disability to themselves. Where there are more than one classification in one event, (for example discus throw F54/55/56), a points system is used to determine the winner.

F = field athletes
T = track athletes
11-13 – visually impaired, 11 and 12 compete with a sighted guide
20 – intellectual disability
31-38 – cerebral palsy or other conditions that affect muscle co-ordination and control. Athletes in class 31-34 compete in a seated position; athletes in class 35-38 compete standing.
40-47 – amputation, les autres
51-58 – wheelchair athletes

Schedule

Medal table

Multiple medallists
Many competitors won multiple medals at the 2016 Championships. The following athletes won four medals or more.

Participating nations
Below is the list of countries who agreed to participate in the Championships and the requested number of athlete places for each.

 (7)	
 (10)	
 (8)	
 (12)	
 (17)
 (1)	
 (8)	
 (3)	
 (10)	
 (24)	
 (30)	
 (48)	
 (16)	
 (7)	
 (9)	
 (4)	
 (2)	
 (36)		
 (5)
 (11)	
 (1)
 (2)	
 (3)	
 (7)		
 (51)	
 (25)	
 (5)	
 (100)	
 (10)
 (7)	
 (1)	
 (34)	
 (11)	
 (8)
 (26)

See also
2016 European Athletics Championships

Footnotes
Notes

References

External links
 Official web-site

 
World Para Athletics European Championships
IPC Athletics European Championships
IPC Athletics European Championships
International athletics competitions hosted by Italy
Sport in Grosseto